Peace in Our Time is the fourth studio album by Scottish band Big Country, released in 1988.

Critical reception
Trouser Press wrote that "Big Country took a surprising detour on the deliriously overproduced Peace in Our Time, which submerges its trademark sound in sanitized, synthesized musical settings ... [the] drastic recast feels like commercial desperation rather than artistic restlessness." The Chicago Tribune wrote that the album displays "a more gentle and subtle style and a crisper, more delicate sound."

Track listing

Chart performance

Personnel
Big Country
Stuart Adamson - guitar, piano, vocals, e-bow
Mark Brzezicki - drums, percussion
Tony Butler - bass, guitar, vocals
Bruce Watson - guitar, harmonica, mandolin, sitar, vocals, e-bow

Additional personnel
Peter Wolf - keyboards
Maxine Anderson - backing vocals
Merry Clayton - backing vocals
Donna Davidson - backing vocals
Josh Phillips - keyboards

References

1988 albums
Big Country albums
albums produced by Peter Wolf
Reprise Records albums